Giulio Palmonella (14 March 1919 – 20 April 1982) was an Italian modern pentathlete. He competed at the 1948 and 1952 Summer Olympics.

References

External links
 

1919 births
1982 deaths
People from Civitavecchia
Italian male modern pentathletes
Olympic modern pentathletes of Italy
Modern pentathletes at the 1948 Summer Olympics
Modern pentathletes at the 1952 Summer Olympics
Sportspeople from the Metropolitan City of Rome Capital
20th-century Italian people